Fairoaks is a 1957 historical novel by the American writer Frank Yerby. It was one of his better critically received works of the 1950s, at a time when his reputation amongst reviewers had been declining despite his popularity with readers.

Synopsis
The novel spans four generations from 1780 to 1884 but focuses particularly on Guy Falks, a Southerner with ambitions and a desire for revenge that takes him to a variety of locations on both sides of the Atlantic Ocean, and the vast plantation Fairoaks.

References

Bibliography
 Hill, James Lee. Anti-heroic Perspectives: The Life and Works of Frank Yerby. University of Iowa, 1976. 
 Tracy, Steven C. Writers of the Black Chicago Renaissance. University of Illinois Press, 2011.

1957 American novels
American historical novels
Novels by Frank Yerby
Dial Press books
Novels set in the 19th century